Ray Richardson is the name of:

Ray Richardson (artist) (born 1964), British painter
Ray Richardson (footballer) (born 1959), English footballer